The Northwest Territories Men's Curling Championship is the men's territorial championship for men's curling in the Northwest Territories. Beginning in 2015, the event serves as a direct qualifier to the Tim Hortons Brier, Canada's national men's curling championships. Prior to 2015, the event served as a qualifier for the Yukon/NWT Men's Curling Championship.

Winners (2015-present)

Winners (up to 2014)

References

The Brier provincial tournaments
Curling in the Northwest Territories